Anerincleistus is a genus of flowering plants belonging to the family Melastomataceae.

Its native range is Tropical Asia.

Species:

Anerincleistus acuminatissimus 
Anerincleistus angustifolius 
Anerincleistus barbatus 
Anerincleistus bracteatus 
Anerincleistus bullatus 
Anerincleistus cornutus 
Anerincleistus curtisii 
Anerincleistus cyathocalyx 
Anerincleistus dispar 
Anerincleistus echinatus 
Anerincleistus fasciculatus 
Anerincleistus floribundus 
Anerincleistus fruticosus 
Anerincleistus grandiflorus 
Anerincleistus griffithii 
Anerincleistus hirsutus 
Anerincleistus hispidissimus 
Anerincleistus macranthus 
Anerincleistus macrophyllus 
Anerincleistus monticola 
Anerincleistus pauciflorus 
Anerincleistus pedunculatus 
Anerincleistus philippinensis 
Anerincleistus phyllagathoides 
Anerincleistus pittonii
Anerincleistus pulchra 
Anerincleistus purpureus 
Anerincleistus quintuplinervis 
Anerincleistus rupicola 
Anerincleistus sertuliferum 
Anerincleistus setosus 
Anerincleistus setulosus 
Anerincleistus stipularis

References

Melastomataceae
Melastomataceae genera